Arnull is a surname. Notable people with the surname include:

Bill Arnull (1785–1835), British jockey, son of John and nephew of Sam
John Arnull (1753–1815), British flat racing jockey
Sam Arnull ( 1760–1800), British flat racing jockey
Antony Arnull (unknown), British legal scholar